Martin Horák (born 16 September 1980) is a former Czech footballer. Besides the Czech Republic, he has played in Russia. Horak was part of the Czech side which won the UEFA U-21 Championships in 2002.

Honours
Russian Premier League runner-up: 2003

References

External links

1980 births
Living people
Czech footballers
Czech Republic youth international footballers
Czech Republic under-21 international footballers
Czech expatriate footballers
FC Viktoria Plzeň players
AC Sparta Prague players
FC Zenit Saint Petersburg players
Denizlispor footballers
FC Rostov players
FC Shinnik Yaroslavl players
FC Sibir Novosibirsk players
Expatriate footballers in Russia
Expatriate footballers in Turkey
Russian Premier League players
Süper Lig players
Czech First League players
Association football defenders
People from Mohelnice
Sportspeople from the Olomouc Region